Giasuddin Selim is a Bangladeshi film director and screenwriter. He is best known for directing Monpura (2009) and Swapnajaal (2018). He won Bangladesh National Film Award twice: Best Story for the film Adhiar (2003) in 2003 and Best Screenplay for Monpura in 2008. His recent film, Gunin, received criticism from critics and audiences for poor storyline and weak screenplay.

Early life
Selim was born and raised in Feni District. He studied at University of Rajshahi in the marketing department He is an establishment member of 'Bishwabidyalay theatre Rajshahi' at Rajshahi University.

Career
Selim started his career as a scriptwriter. Later he moved on to directing television dramas. His first directed television drama serial was Biprotip.  His debut full-length feature film was Monpura, released in 2009.

Bangal Cinema
Gias Uddin Selim is the founder of Bangal Cinema, a film makers club. This group of young film makers used to be Selim's assistant directors. 
 Zuairijah Mou - Chief Assistant Director
 Yeamin Muzumder - Casting Director & 1st Assistant Director
 Turan Munshi - Line Producer & Production Manager
 Samiun Jahan Dola - Costume Designer
 Forhad Reza Milon - Make up Artist

Filmography

References

External links
 

Year of birth missing (living people)
Living people
University of Rajshahi alumni
Bangladeshi film directors
Bangladeshi television directors
Best Film Directing Meril-Prothom Alo Critics Choice Award winners
Best Screenplay National Film Award (Bangladesh) winners
Best Dialogue National Film Award (Bangladesh) winners
People from Feni District
Best Story National Film Award (Bangladesh) winners